Rocco A. Pirro (June 30, 1916 – January 26, 1995) was an American football player and politician.

Football career
He was a fullback for The Catholic University of America and played in the 1940 Sun Bowl, where he was described as "5-foot 10-inch and 185-pound Arizona jackrabbit."

Pirro was a professional American football Guard who played from 1940 to 1941 with the Pittsburgh Steelers and from 1946 to 1949 with the Buffalo Bills.

Political and business career
During World War II, Pirro served in the United States Navy. Pirro worked as executive director of the Solvay-Geddes Youth Center and the Onondaga County, New York Youth Board. Pirro served on the Geddes, New York Town Board and as town supervisor. He was involved with the Republican Party. He was a member of the New York State Assembly (120th D.) in 1974. In November 1974, he ran for re-election, but was defeated by Democrat/Conservative Melvin N. Zimmer.

Death
Pirro died on January 26, 1995, in Syracuse, New York, at the Van Duyn Home and Hospital.

References

External links
Pro-Football-Reference
Syracuse Hall of Fame Rocco "Rocky" Pirro
Fanbase profile

1916 births
1995 deaths
Buffalo Bills (AAFC) players
Catholic University Cardinals football players
Catholic University of America alumni
Pittsburgh Steelers players
American football offensive guards
Players of American football from Syracuse, New York
Military personnel from New York (state)
Town supervisors in New York (state)
Republican Party members of the New York State Assembly
20th-century American politicians
People from Onondaga County, New York
United States Navy personnel of World War II